Ireland competed at the 2018 Winter Olympics in Pyeongchang, South Korea, from 9 to 25 February 2018. Five athletes represented the country in four sports. OCI Chief Executive Stephen Martin was chef de mission.

Competitors
The following is the list of number of competitors participating in the delegation per sport.

Alpine skiing 

Ireland qualified two alpine skiers, one male and one female.

Cross-country skiing

Thomas Hjalmar Westgård, whose mother is from Dunmore, County Galway and who represented Ireland at the 2017 FIS Nordic World Championships, competed for Ireland in 2018.

Distance

Sprint

Freestyle skiing

Halfpipe

Snowboarding

Seamus O'Connor competed at the 2014 games in the men's halfpipe and men's slopestyle events and received funding for the 2018 event.

Freestyle

See also
Ireland at the 2018 Summer Youth Olympics

References

Nations at the 2018 Winter Olympics
2018 Winter Olympics
Olympics